Egon Parbo (15 April 1910 – 24 April 1942) was an Estonian footballer. He played in 23 matches for the Estonia national football team from 1931 to 1939. He was also named in Estonia's squad for the Group 1 qualification tournament for the 1938 FIFA World Cup.

Parbo was arrested by NKVD agents during the Soviet occupation of Estonia in 1941 and died in a prison camp in Sverdlovsk Oblast, Russia in 1942.

References

External links
 

1910 births
1942 deaths
Estonian footballers
Estonia international footballers
Place of birth missing
Association football midfielders
JK Tallinna Kalev players
Footballers from Tallinn
People from the Governorate of Estonia
Estonian people who died in Soviet detention
People who died in the Gulag